America's Funny But True History (formally America's Horrible Histories) is one of the many spin-offs of Horrible Histories. The series is written by Elizabeth Levy and explores the history of North America, focusing on the United States in the latter books.

The books appear in school and library reading and study lists.

Titles
The series consists of the following works:

1. Who Are You Calling a Woolly Mammoth? : Prehistoric America (2001) - (Prehistoric America)
2. Awesome Ancient Ancestors! : Mound Builders, Maya, and More (2001) - (Aztecs, Incas, Mayans...)
3. Are We There Yet? : Europeans Meet the Americans (2002) - (European Colonization of the Americas)
4. Cranky Colonials: 1560s - 1740s (2003) - (American Colonies)
5. Revolting Revolutionaries : 1750s - 1790s (2003) - (American Revolutions)
6. Westward, Ha-Ha! : 1800-1850 (2003) - (The American West)

Controversy of title

According to an extract from Elizabeth Levy, "America's Horrible Histories" is now formally known as "America's Funny But True History" (hence the old series is obsolete), bringing some controversy over which books are officially part of which series and which books have which logos on top of them. She decided this after she wrote "Are We There Yet", most probably for copyright reasons related to the Horrible Histories series. Her next book, Cranky Colonials was the first book to have the new title.

Critical reception
Spirit of Jefferson Farmer's Advocate called Awesome Ancient Ancestors "tongue in cheek". while Publishers Weekly described Who Are You Calling a Woolly Mammoth? and Awesome Ancient Ancestors! as "a punchy perspective on the past"

See also

 Elizabeth Levy
 Horrible Histories
 History of America (disambiguation)

References

External links
Elizabeth Levy's Home Page

Book series introduced in 2001
21st-century history books
Series of children's books
Children's history books
History books about the United States
Horrible Histories